Triplophysa yasinensis is a species of ray-finned fish in the genus Triplophysa.

References 
 

yasinensis
Taxa named by Alfred William Alcock
Fish described in 1898